Karl Samuda (born 8 February 1942) is a Jamaican politician. He completed his education at the University of Ottawa and is currently the Minister without Portfolio in the Ministry of Economic Growth and Job Creation with responsibility for Water, Works and Housing in Jamaica and previously the Minister of Industry, Commerce, Agriculture and Fisheries and served in that position between 2007 and 2011.

Karl Samuda is a businessman, farmer and a technocrat and, is best known as a veteran politician.

He attended Ardenne High School and pursued tertiary education in Canada, where he obtained a Bachelor of Commerce Degree from the University of Ottawa. Steeped in the discipline of Business Administration, he returned to Jamaica and was employed to Alcan Jamaica Limited and Industrial Gases Limited before venturing into furniture manufacturing and later farming, vocations which still occupy his interest, if and when his ministerial duties and political activities allow.

Karl Samuda also served on the Electoral Commission of Jamaica, having previously served an eight-year stint as a member of the Electoral Advisory Committee.

A former General Secretary of the Jamaica Labour Party, Karl Samuda has been the Member of Parliament for Saint Andrew North Central since 1980, and has the distinction of representing both major political parties in that constituency.

He has served as Minister of State in earlier administrations and was Minister of Industry, Commerce Agriculture & Fisheries as well as Minister without Portfolio in the Ministry of Economic Growth and Job Creation (MEGJC), He also serves as Minister of Education from 2019-2020.

He is married and has three sons.

References 

Living people
Members of the House of Representatives of Jamaica
Government ministers of Jamaica
Education Ministers of Jamaica
University of Ottawa alumni
Year of birth missing (living people)
Place of birth missing (living people)
Members of the 14th Parliament of Jamaica